Zsuzsanna "Zsu" Jakabos (born 3 April 1989) is a Hungarian swimmer. She competed at the 2004, 2008, 2012 and 2016 Olympics in seven events in total, with the best achievement of sixth place in the  freestyle relay in 2008 and 2016.

In 2019 Jakabos was member of the 2019 International Swimming League representing Team Iron.

Awards
 Hungarian swimmer of the Year (1): 2005
  Cross of Merit of the Republic of Hungary – Bronze Cross (2008)

Private life
She is married to her swimming coach Iván Petrov.

References

1989 births
Living people
Hungarian female butterfly swimmers
Hungarian female medley swimmers
Olympic swimmers of Hungary
Sportspeople from Pécs
Swimmers at the 2004 Summer Olympics
Swimmers at the 2008 Summer Olympics
Swimmers at the 2012 Summer Olympics
Swimmers at the 2016 Summer Olympics
European Aquatics Championships medalists in swimming
Swimmers at the 2020 Summer Olympics
UNLV Rebels women's swimmers
Competitors at the 2022 World Games
World Games gold medalists
World Games silver medalists
Hungarian female freestyle swimmers
21st-century Hungarian women